Stechford railway station serves the Stechford area of Birmingham, England on Victoria Road, just off Station Road, which is part of the A4040 Birmingham outer ring road. The station and all trains serving it are operated by West Midlands Trains. It lies at the junction between the Birmingham to Coventry line and the predominantly freight-only Stechford-Aston spur. The station was much more important at the end of the 19th century, retaining a working freight yard until as late as the 1980s. The yard tracks have since been lifted.

Platform 1 is used by services to Birmingham New Street and was also served by a few direct services from Birmingham International to Walsall, platform 2 is used by services to Birmingham International, Coventry and London Euston. Platform 3 currently has no timetabled services. Up Walsall to Birmingham International trains formerly had a platform face of their own (platform 3), but down Birmingham International to Walsall trains used the up main platform via a facing crossover. The 19th-century bridge over the railway underwent renovation from August to September 2006.

On 28 February 1967, Stechford station was the scene of a train collision.

History 
The original London & Birmingham Railway Stechford station opened in December 1844  with staggered platforms on either side of a level-crossing. In 1882, the level crossing became a bridge (Station Road) over the railway, the platforms were moved to the west (Birmingham) side of the bridge and a station building on the bridge became the entrance to both sets of platforms via steps. Around 1963, this building was demolished (the supports can still be seen next to the Station Road bridge) and a small utilitarian replacement building was provided in Frederick Road.

Until 2020, Stechford station had poor access for people with mobility impairments. Steep steps led from the ticket office to the Birmingham platform, and the Coventry platform could be reached only by traversing a further bridge. The situation was resolved by construction of a new footbridge with lifts, connected by a ramp from the booking office.

Facilities
The station has a ticket office located at the station entrance off Station Road which is open Monday-Thursday 07:00-14:00, Friday 07:00-19:00, Saturday 08:00-17:00 and Sunday 10:00-12:00. When the ticket office is open tickets must be purchased before boarding the train. Outside of these times there is a ticket machine outside the ticket office which accepts card payments only - cash and voucher payments can be made to the senior conductor on the train.

Cycle parking is available.

Step free access is available between the platforms via lifts and an overbridge. Station staff provide information and assistance whilst the ticket office is open. Outside of these hours information is available from help points located on both platforms and from the senior conductor on the train.

Services
A limited service operates beyond  towards  and  mainly at peak times and the start/end of service.

All services are operated by West Midlands Trains.

References

External links 

Rail Around Birmingham and the West Midlands: Stechford railway station
Railways of Warwickshire entry

Former London and North Western Railway stations
Railway stations in Birmingham, West Midlands
DfT Category E stations
Railway stations in Great Britain opened in 1844
Railway stations served by West Midlands Trains